Roger Zetter is Emeritus Professor of Refugee Studies, former Director of the Refugee Studies Centre at University of Oxford and the founding editor of the Journal of Refugee Studies (a position held until 2001), published by Oxford University Press. His teaching, research, publications and consultancy on forced displacement, refugee and humanitarian affairs include all stages of the refugee and displacement cycle.

Zetter has been a consultant to many international organisations including UNHCR, UNDP, UNFPA, UNHABITAT, ILO, International Organization for Migration, IFRC, World Bank, OXFAM and Swiss Agency for Development and Cooperation, with research having been funded by ESRC, MacArthur Foundation, Joseph Rowntree Foundation, Paul Hamlyn Foundation and MPI.

Education

Following degrees from the University of Cambridge and University of Nottingham, Zetter completed his DPhil at the Institute of Development Studies, University of Sussex.

Selected publications
 Zetter, R., Sigona, N. & Bloch, A. 2014. Sans Papiers: The Social and Economic Lives of Young Undocumented Migrants. Pluto Press. .
 Zetter, R. & Watson, G. B. 2006. Designing Sustainable Cities in the Developing World. Routledge. .
 Zetter, R. & Ward, P. 2004. Assessment Of The Impact Of Asylum Policies In Europe 1990-2000. Diane Pub Co. .
 Zetter, R. & Hamza, M. 2004. Market Economy and Urban Change: Impacts in the Developing World. Routledge. .
 Zetter, R. & White, R. 2003. Planning in Cities: Sustainability and Growth in the Developing World. Practical Action. .

References

External links
Oxford Department of International Development: https://www.qeh.ox.ac.uk/people/roger-zetter.
Refugee Studies Centre: https://www.rsc.ox.ac.uk/people/roger-zetter

Living people
Alumni of the University of Cambridge
Alumni of the University of Nottingham
Alumni of the University of Sussex
Academic journal editors
Year of birth missing (living people)